Aleksandr Shimanov (born 8 May 1992) is a Russian chess player. He was awarded the title of Grandmaster (GM) by FIDE in 2009.

Chess career
He won the Saint Petersburg City Chess Championship in 2012 and played in the Chess World Cup 2013, where he was defeated in the second round by Gata Kamsky.

References

External links 
 
 Aleksandr Shimanov chess games at 365Chess.com
 

1992 births
Living people
Chess grandmasters
Russian chess players
Sportspeople from Saint Petersburg